The two-faced toadfish (Bifax lacinia) is a species of toadfish known only from the coast of Oman.

References

Batrachoididae
Fish described in 1994